Jan Olof Ekström (2 November 1923 in Falun, Sweden – 17 August 2013) was a Swedish author and adman.

Biography
Jan Ekström has lived in Gislaved but graduated in Växjö. He studied national economy, Slavic languages, English and statistics in Lund, thereafter he studied at the Handelshögskolan in Stockholm. He was in the beginning of the 80's co-owner of the ad firm "Ekström & Lindmark". He has also lived in Paris, France.

As an author Jan Ekström debuted 1961 with "Döden fyller år" (The Death's Birthday) and the next year he introduced his problem-solver, the red haired and opera loving detective Bertil Durell. For "Träfracken" (The wood tuxedo) he got Expressens Sherlock-award. Jan Ekström is most famous as an author of mystery novels with complicated intrigue, though he has written romans and articles to trade presses. Jan Ekström was also a member of Svenska Deckarakademin (the Swedish Detective Story Academy).

The novel Ålkistan (The Eel Chest) is claimed to be one of the few Swedish examples of a successful answer on the locked room mystery.

The novels Träfracken and Morianerna also exists in film form.

Bibliography
 Döden fyller år (1961)
 Döden går i moln (1962)
 Träfracken (1963) (Also filmed in 1966)
 Morianerna (1964) (Also filmed in 1965)
 Daggormen (1965)
 Ålkistan (1967)
 Elddansen (1970)
 Sagan om kommunen som ville bygga rationellt (1975)
 Ättestupan (1975)
 Mannen i berget (1979)
 Svarta veckan vid Lycée international de St-Germain-en-Laye (1983)
 Blommor till Rose (1986)
 Uniformen (1987) 
 Noveller Julen 1989 (1989) 
 Vildfikonträdet (1994)

Prices and awards 
 Sherlock-priset, 1963
 Svenska Deckarakademin's Grand Master-diploma, 1997

Sources
 Kjell E Genbergs Deckarsidor
 Albert Bonniers förlag

Footnotes

Swedish male writers
1923 births
2013 deaths
Swedish writers